Alfred Ryder (born Alfred Jacob Corn; January 5, 1916 – April 16, 1995) was an American television, stage, radio, and film actor and director, who appeared in over one hundred television shows.

Career
Ryder began to act at age eight and later studied with Robert Lewis and Lee Strasberg. He eventually became a life member of The Actors Studio.

During the 1930s and 40s, Ryder blended Broadway appearances with two memorable roles during the Golden Age of Radio, as Molly Goldberg's son Sammy in The Goldbergs; and as Carl Neff in Easy Aces. During World War II he served in the United States Army Air Forces and appeared in the Air Force's Broadway play and film Winged Victory. In 1946 he secured a one-year film contract with Paramount and had a role in the Anthony Mann-directed film noir T-Men (1947).

Ryder was an ambitious and intense theater performer who aspired to be "the definitive Hamlet of his generation." In the 1940s he joined the American Repertory Theatre, founded by Margaret Webster and Eva Le Gallienne; Webster's follow-up troupe, the Margaret Webster Shakespeare Company—for which he toured as Hamlet; and ultimately The Actors Studio. In the 1950s he continued appearing on Broadway (supplemented with television work), his most fruitful years coinciding with his 1958-1964 marriage to renowned stage actress (and fellow Actors Studio member) Kim Stanley, whom he would direct in the 1961 Broadway hit A Far Country.

In 1956, Atlantic Records released the spoken-word album This Is My Beloved with Ryder reciting the popular poetry of Walter Benton. 

Notably, Ryder was chosen to be Laurence Olivier's standby when The Entertainer moved to Broadway from London in 1958.

He won the 1959 Obie Award for Best Actor, playing D.H. Lawrence in Tennessee Williams' one-act play I Rise in Flame, Cried the Phoenix. Kim Stanley hosted the awards presentation, but her husband was away in rehearsals for a CBS adaptation of Billy Budd, having been cast as Claggart as a rush replacement for an ailing Jason Robards, Jr. Ryder's growing association with the less-vaunted medium was reflected in TIME's announcement of their marriage; Stanley was feted as "star of Broadway's Bus Stop, and of Hollywood's The Goddess, whose training at the Actors' Studio [sic] made her the standard Brando of U.S. actresses," while Ryder was solely and dismissively identified as "TV actor Alfred Ryder," without even a mention of Ryder's own association with The Actors Studio.

In 1961 Ryder was cast as Eli Wallach's first replacement as Bérenger (a role originated in London by Olivier) in the Broadway production of Eugène Ionesco's Rhinoceros. Ryder also would tour in the part with Zero Mostel, who had won a Tony Award in the play's other starring role.  

In 1964, 48-year-old Ryder was selected by impresario Joseph Papp to realize his dream and perform Hamlet in a high-profile production: a three-week engagement for Papp's Shakespeare in the Park. Notoriously, he was replaced after opening night by Robert Burr, who was understudying Richard Burton in the same role on Broadway. According to press reports, Ryder was suffering from laryngitis by the premiere, which was broadcast on CBS, but co-star Stacy Keach also recounted Ryder’s erratic performances and difficulty remembering lines in rehearsals due to drinking. Actress Lee Grant stated that Ryder’s stage career was “ruined” by the fact that the performance was televised and that Ryder was replaced afterward, compounded by Papp’s public refusal to allow Ryder to return to the role following his recovery from the throat infection. 

The disappointment to Ryder was "acute," according to Ellen Adler, daughter of famed acting coach Stella Adler. "He was sort of promised he would be a great Broadway star, and somehow it never happened." Ryder would never again act on or off-Broadway, though he subsequently directed two more Broadway plays—1968's The Exercise and a 1971 production of The Dance of Death—both of which closed in less than one week. (In Los Angeles, Ryder would direct for UCLA's Theatre Group as a member of the Actors Studio Directors Unit and also for the U.S. Government's Educational Laboratory Theatre Project.)

Nevertheless, Ryder remained an A-list television guest star throughout the 1960's, as his eccentric, theatrical style and vaguely Germanic accent were well-suited for the sci-fi, spy, and fantasy shows that were popular at the time. He appeared in multiple episodes of The Wild Wild West and The Man from U.N.C.L.E., and he played the main alien leader, Mr. Nexus, in the TV series The Invaders (two seasons, 1967-68). He starred as a British criminal who could not be killed in Alcoa Presents: One Step Beyond episode "The Devil's Laughter'" (1959) - an accent almost totally believable until he pronounced 'lever' as "levver"! He also  appeared in "The Man Trap", the first-aired episode of Star Trek, on September 8, 1966, as a scientist who is hiding the fact that a shapeshifting alien is masquerading as his late wife. He also guest-starred as the ghost of a World War I German U-boat captain in two episodes of Irwin Allen's ABC-TV series Voyage to the Bottom of the Sea. He then acted in an episode of another Irwin Allen series on ABC, as a cantankerous orphanage operator, Parteg, in "Night of Thrombeldinbar", an episode of Land of the Giants in February 1969. Later he appeared in the episode "A Hand for Sonny Blue" in the series Quinn Martin's Tales of the Unexpected (1977; known in the United Kingdom as Twist in the Tale).

Ryder's film work was more sporadic; his highest-profile role was the defense attorney who cross-examines John Wayne in True Grit (1969).

By the 1970s, Ryder's credits (and billing) had diminished, with his last significant role coming in 1979, on Steve Allen's PBS faux-talk show Meeting of Minds, for which he also co-directed two episodes. Despite an energetic performance as Machiavelli with extensive dialogue, Ryder only appeared once more onscreen, as restauranteur Mike Romanoff in the 1980 Humphrey Bogart TV-biopic Bogie.

In his later years Ryder lived with his sister, actress Olive Deering, eventually moving to the Actors Home in New Jersey, where he died of liver cancer in 1995.

Personal life
Born to Jewish parents, he was married to actress Kim Stanley from 1958 until 1964. The couple had a child, Laurie Ryder, a California pediatrician and child advocate. He was the brother of actress Olive Deering (1918–1986). 

Ryder was a Democrat who supported the campaign of Adlai Stevenson during the 1952 presidential election.

Select list of appearances  

1944: Winged Victory - Milhauser 
1947: T-Men - Tony Genaro - aka Tony Galvani
1959: Gunsmoke (episode "Passive Resistance") - Hank Voyles
1959: The Story on Page One - Lt. Mike Morris
1959: Alcoa Presents: One Step Beyond (episode "The Devil's Laughter") - John Marriott
1960: Route 66 (episode "The Man on the Monkey Board") - Palmer
1961: Bus Stop (episode "I Kiss Your Shadow") - Doug Gibson
1963: The Raiders - Capt. Bentonn
1963: The Outer Limits (episode "The Borderland") - Edgar Price
1964: Combat! (episode "The Hunter") - Capt. Heismann (Season: 2 Episode: 24)
1964: Invitation to a Gunfighter - Doc Barker
1964: Hamlet - Hamlet
1965: Gunsmoke (episode "Death Watch") - Newspaperman Flint
1965: The Man from U.N.C.L.E. (episode "The See-Paris-and-Die Affair") - Corio
1965: The Wild Wild West (TV Series) (season 1, episode 13) (air date: December 10, 1965) "The Night of the Torture Chamber" - Professor Horatio Bolt / (season 2, episode 22) (air date: February 24, 1967) "The Night of the Deadly Bubble" - Captain Philo
1966: Voyage to the Bottom of the Sea (episodes "The Phantom Strikes" / "The Heat Monster") - U-boat Captain Gerhardt Krueger / Dr Bergstrom
1966: Star Trek (episode "The Man Trap") - Professor Robert Crater
1967: Hotel - Capt. Yolles
1967: Invaders - Mr. Nexus (3 episodes)
1967: The Rat Patrol (episode "The Darkest Raid") - Col. Rudolf Gerschon in Season: 2 - Episode: 6
1967: Mission Impossible (episode "The Diplomat") - Col. Valentin Yetkoff
1969: Ironside (episode "Up, Down and Even") - Sgt John Darga
1969: True Grit - Goudy
1971: Mission Impossible (episode "The Party") - Gregor Mishenko
1972: The Legend of Hillbilly John - O. J. Onselm
1973: The Stone Killer - Tony Champion
1974: W - Investigator
1975: Escape to Witch Mountain - Mr. Michael-John - Astrologer
1977: Tracks - The Man
1979: Buck Rogers In The 25th Century (episode "Escape From Wedded Bliss") - Garridan (former chief engineer for The Draconia)

References

External links
 
 
 
 

1916 births
1995 deaths
20th-century American male actors
American male film actors
American male radio actors
American male television actors
Male actors from New York City
New York (state) Democrats
California Democrats